Sebt Aziz is a town and commune in Médéa Province, Algeria.

Aziz, in (Arabic: عزيز 1,2), or Sebt Aziz is the largest municipality by its surface area of the Wilaya of Medea (or 6.23% of the total). It is the capital of a Daïra of the same name.

References

Communes of Médéa Province